Beit Ula, Beit Aula, is a Palestinian town in the Hebron Governorate of the State of Palestine, located ten kilometers northwest of Hebron, in the southern West Bank.

Location 
It is bordered by Nuba to the north, Umm 'Allas to the west, and Tarqumiyah to the south. The valley of el-Yehudi ("valley of the Jews"), also known in Hebrew as the Nahal haEla ("Ela stream"), lies to the east.

History
The PEF's Survey of Western Palestine (SWP) suggested several possible Biblical connection.

Ottoman era
In the Ottoman census of 932 AH/1525-1526 CE, Bayt Awla was noted as mazraa land, that is cultivated land, located in the nahiya of Halil.

In 1838, Edward Robinson noted Beit Ula as a Muslim village, between the mountains and Gaza, but subject to the government of Hebron. It was one of a cluster of villages at the foot of a mountain, together with Kharas and Nuba.

Socin, citing an official Ottoman village list compiled around 1870, noted that Betula, located north east of Tarqumiyah, had 51 houses and a population of 207, though the population count included men, only. Hartmann found that Bet Ula had 80 houses.

In 1883 the PEF's Survey of Western Palestine (SWP) described Beit Aula as "a small village standing on a spur surrounded with olives. It has a well on the west in the valley, a mile away.”

British Mandate era
In the 1922 census of Palestine, conducted by the British Mandate authorities, Beit Ula had a population of 825 inhabitants, all Muslims, increasing in the 1931 census to 1,045, still entirely Muslim, in 217 inhabited houses. In the latter census it was counted with Kh. Beit Kanun, Kh. Hawala and Kh. Tawas.

In the 1945 statistics the population of Beit Ula was 1,310 Muslims, and the total land area was 24,045 dunams of land according to an official land and population survey. Of this, 1,324 dunams were plantations and irrigable land, 8,747 were for cereals, while 71 dunams were built-up (urban) land.

Jordanian era
In the wake of the 1948 Arab–Israeli War, and after the 1949 Armistice Agreements, Beit Ula came under Jordanian rule. It was annexed by Jordan in 1950.

In 1961, the population of Beit Aula was 1,677.

Post-1967
Since the Six-Day War in 1967, Beit Ula has been under Israeli occupation.

According to the Palestinian Central Bureau of Statistics, the town had a population of 10,885 inhabitants in 2007.

Beit Ula has a total land area of 22,432 dunams, of which 74.5% is located in Area B (Palestinian National Authority (PNA) is in control of civil affairs and Israel's responsible for security) and 25.5% is located in Area C (complete Israeli control).

References

Bibliography

External links
Welcome to Bayt Aula
 Beit Ula, Welcome to Palestine
Survey of Western Palestine, Map 21:  IAA, Wikimedia commons
Beit Ula town (fact sheet), Applied Research Institute–Jerusalem (ARIJ)
 Beit Ula town profile, ARIJ
Beit Ula aerial photo, ARIJ
The priorities and needs for development in Beit Ula town based on the community and local authorities’ assessment, ARIJ

Hebron Governorate
Towns in the West Bank
Municipalities of the State of Palestine